Following an historical process of appropriation of American popular music by Senegal, hip hop emerged in the Senegalese capital city in the early mid- 1980s. Although hip hop galsen is now famous for its diverse musical productions, the movement there spread out from its dancing appeal rather than from its musical one. Indeed, Senegalese hip hop artists initially participated in this movement as smurfer, breakdancer, B-boy in general performing during organised podiums. Schools, nightclubs and other temporary public stages thus played an essential role in amplifying this movement in Dakar. Besides, and in contrast to American hip hop, which grew from the youth in the inner city ghettos, hip hop in Dakar began among a somehow middle-class youth who was able to access and/or introduce in their home place new ideas and new cultural expressions coming from abroad. Indeed, hip hop became popular in the capital city through the intensive through informal circulation of VH7 cassettes and recorded videos, which were imported from USA (Africa Bambaataa) or France (hip hop dance TV show HIPHOP animated by Sydney) by diaspora people.

Quickly, podiums enlarged their performances from dancers only to rappers as well. It was a time when soon-to-be hip hop artists were still mimicking American artists they actively used to listen to such Africa Bambaataa, Grandmaster Flash, Furious Five, Delight, Doug E. Fresh or Public Enemy for the most well-known. Indeed, rap, the MC performance, was still then a phonetic repetition, a copycatting of either American rappers or, with hip hop booming in France in the 1980s, of French hip hop artists such as Assassin, NTM, IAM or Mc Solaar. Without the real capacity for translating the movement and its expressions in Senegalese terms yet, the mid-1980s in Dakar were however definitively hip hop. And whenever the classical hip hop film Beat Street was circulating in local cinemas, young people were following the movie from showroom to showroom in order to view it again and again and to know by heart the famous lyrics of Grandmaster Flash.

Evolution of a culture (1989–1994) 

Nevertheless, this copycat period did not last long, and getting inspired by the French example, Senegalese hip hop artists soon started to write their own texts in their languages, forming groups or collective with school peers and starting to get known and recognised in their neighbourhoods. In 1989, two groups mainly dominated the Dakar scene: Syndikat initiated by Didier Awadi and King MCs led by Duggy Tee. Rather than keeping on challenging themselves, they decided to get together to create Positive Black Soul (PBS) with the desire to promote a positive image of Africa. Indeed, at that time, the first years of the structural adjustments imposed by the IMF had considerably worsened the living conditions of the Senegalese, leaving a limited choice to the younger generations: facing unemployment or, for the wealthier, leaving the country in order to study abroad.  A new image, a positive one was most needed and Hip Hop appeared as an emancipating mean of expression for a disillusioned youth. From its dancing expression, hip hop's appeal then definitively moved to its musical expression with artists voicing out the dual anger and hunger of Senegal's younger generations. Through its music form, hip hop stood as a language as well as a message for a youth witnessing injustice, corruption and power abuses from the political elite. Indeed, rapping their disapprobation with the harsh reality they were suffering from was a way for young artists to remind that that, they, as well, could 'represent' the voiceless population.

In late 1980s and beginning 1990s, the capacity for recording and releasing a musical product was still limited for hip hop artists so they were getting known mostly though the circulation of "demos", i.e. instrumental recordings of existing songs on which the young MC could rap. These "instru" or 'demo' were an essential aspect of the development of a soon-to-be hip hop artist as they allowed him to practice his performance, to experiment his "flow", and to try to rap on different rhythms. Moreover, these preliminary products were extremely useful for an artist aspiring to appear on a compilation to present and represent his potential. With respect, the first release of a hip hop production was finally a text of PBS, "Bagn Bagn Beug" on a compilation, "Dakar 92" produced by the French Cultural Centre. Then, after having performed in the first part of MC Solaar's show in Dakar, and with a growing popularity, PBS released "Boul Faalé", a recorded cassette in which the group articulated a vehement discourse denouncing the corruption of the PS (political party) then in power. With this release in 1994, "hip hop galsen" was starting its genealogy.

Booming of a generation (1994–2000) 

From the mid-1990s, hip hop galsen was building a name for itself and becoming more and more visible globally with now well-known hip hop groups such as Daara J, Positive Black Soul (PBS) or, later on, Pee Froiss touring throughout the world. Indeed, pioneer groups of hip hop galsen entered the global scene of the music industry with, in 1994, PBS signing with Island Records and, in 1996, Daara J signing with Declic Communication. Besides, both groups were soon taking care of by internationally known publishers  (Polygram-Universal for PBS and BMG for Daara J) and booking agents (MMP for PBS and Furax for Daara J), boosting their respective career worldwide.

Meanwhile, a second "generation" was emerging in Dakar and the local hip hop scene was increasingly getting diversified. By the late 1990s, hip hop galsen had reached its peak with groups and genres booming everywhere alongside an active practice of the 'clash'. Geographically, hip hop galsen was represented in Dakar and in its most popular banlieues, such as Guédiawaye or Thiaroye but also in the regional cities, like Kaolack or Saint Louis. Besides, hip hop as a medium of expression allowed for different messages to be articulated and thus a consequent diversification of genres in the musical productions (from hardcore to mainstream, from politically engaged to more party oriented, from a social to a more individual discourse) as well as in the groups composition with the appearance of the first female figures. In the late 1990s, beginning 2000s, hip hop galsen was definitively coming of age.

Development of an economy (2000s–present)

Besides, for hip hop galsen, coming of age also meant structuring the capacity of the movement to develop, sustain and enhance their cultural productions. Already in 1998, Didier Awadi created from a bedroom, and with a bit of material he bought thanks to his first artist fees, Taf-Taf Production. Although this structure was then informal, it possessed a PA system which allowed on the one hand, hip hop artists to have access to a required material for diffusing their music, and on the other hand, Awadi to further cumulate revenues and to open, in 2003, a formal recording studio, Studio Sankara. Meanwhile, other initiatives were also being taken in order to improve the diffusion of hip hop music such as the creation of hip hop awards by the structure, Optimist Produktion. Created in 2000, this event was first thought of as a talent awards ceremony but few years after its creation it evolved to become one of the most visible hip hop festival in the West African region. Since the emergences of these early musical structures, other festivals and recording studios dedicated to hip hop were developed by artists of the movement in Dakar but also in its banlieues as well as in the Senegalese regional cities. Meanwhile, TV as well as radio shows and webzines dedicated to hip hop galsen multiplied, increasing the diffusion of the movement and its musical productions. Besides, this new era also witnessed the coming back on the hip hop galsen scene of hip hop dance, with the revival of b-boy crews such as X-trem BBoys and the creation of the dance festival Kaay Fecc.

Between 2007 and 2009, there was a real booming of new structures created by hip hop artists and motivated by the desire to be locally independent in terms of musical production. These structures are now as diverse as multiple including recording studios, festivals, labels but also associations, graphic design agencies, video production agencies, duplication plants, fully equipped rehearsal rooms, event and communication agencies, PA system rental agencies, street wear brands and designers (inspired by Graffiti artists, i.e. the graphic expression of Hip Hop), and security agencies. These entrepreneurial dynamics of the hip hop artists were consecrated in January 2009 with the launch of THE event of the hip hop galsen community, 72H Hip Hop. This latest initiative collectively organised by these hip hop entrepreneurs stands as a  three days event putting together conferences, performances, exhibitions, and workshops dedicated to hip hop galsen. Since its marking of the 20 years of the movement, 72H Hip Hop annually celebrates on January 1, 2 and 3rd, the ever promising dynamism of hip hop galsen.

Notes

References

Other Academic References

External links

See also 
 Waga Hip Hop
 ALIF (Liberate Attack of the Feminist Infantry)
 AURA (United Artists for African Rap)
 Didier Awadi
 Lord Alajiman (Daara J)
 Baay Sooley (PBS)
 Gee Bayss (Pee Froiss)
 Keyti (Rap'Adio)
 K-ID (Chronik 2H)
 Matador (WA BMG 44)
 Moona
 Simon Bisbi Clan (Jolof 4 Life)

Senegalese culture
African hip hop
Hip hop genres